Beauty Dies is the third EP by The Raveonettes, and was released on 21 October 2008. It is a second release in a three-part release of digital download EPs over three months.

Track listing

References

2008 EPs
The Raveonettes albums
Vice Records albums